is a national highway connecting Nagano, Nagano and Ojiya, Niigata in Japan.

Route data
Length: 119.6 km (74.3 mi)
Origin: Nagano City (originates at junction with Route 18)
Terminus: Ojiya City (ends at Junction with Route 17)
Major cities: Iiyama, Tokamachi

History
1953-05-18 - Second Class National Highway 117 (from Nagano to Ojiya)
1965-04-01 - General National Highway 117 (from Nagano to Ojiya)

Overlapping sections
In Nagano City, from Nakagosho intersection to Nishiowaribe intersection: Route 19
In Nagano City, Nishiowaribe intersection to Asano intersection: Route 18
In Nagano City, Higashiwada intersection to Yanagihara-Kita intersection: Route 406
In Iiyama City, Komaki-bashi kita intersection to Ario intersection: Route 292

Municipalities passed through
Nagano Prefecture
Nagano - Obuse - Nagano - Nakano - Iiyama - Nozawaonsen - Sakae
Niigata Prefecture
Tsunan - Tokamachi - Ojiya - Nagaoka - Ojiya

Intersects with

Nagano Prefecture
Route 18
Route 19
Route 406
Route 406
Route 18
Route 292
Route 403
Route 292
Route 403
Niigata Prefecture

See also

References

External links

117
Roads in Nagano Prefecture
Roads in Niigata Prefecture